The women's qualification for the Olympic rugby sevens tournament will occur between November 2022 and June 2024, allocating twelve teams for the final tournament. All six WR (World Rugby) zones are expected to have a continental representation in the Olympic rugby sevens tournament. The host nation France reserves a direct quota place each in the men's and women's tournament with the remainder of the total quota attributed to the eligible NOCs across three qualifying routes.

The top four teams at the end of the 2022–23 World Rugby Sevens Series will directly secure the Paris 2024 spots for their respective NOC. Then, six further places will be awarded to each of the six confederations (Africa, Asia, Europe, Oceania, North America, and South America) at their designated 2023 World Rugby Regional Association Olympic Qualification Tournaments. To complete the twelve-team field for Paris 2024, the remaining berth will be offered to the winner of the 2024 Final Olympic Qualification Tournament to be scheduled a month before the Games commence.

Qualified teams

2022–23 World Rugby Women's Sevens Series 

As a principal route for the tournament, the top four teams will secure their spots for Paris 2024. based on the total points accrued throughout the seven-tournament series.

{| class="wikitable" style="font-size:92%;"
|-
!colspan=2| Legend
|-
|style="width:4.5em;"|No colour
|- 
|style="background:#fcc;"|Pink
| the lowest placed core team at the end of 2022–23.
|- 
|style="background:#ffc;"|Yellow
|Not a core team
|-
|-
|}

2023 Africa Women's Sevens 

2023 Africa Women's Sevens are scheduled to run from 14 to 15 October 2023 in Tunis, Tunisia with the pre-qualifying meet staged in Zambia on 1–2 July 2023. Further details will be eventually confirmed and announced by Rugby Africa.

Pool
Group A

Group B

Knockout stage

Ranking

2023 Asia Rugby Women's Sevens Olympic Qualifying Tournament 

The 2023 Asia Rugby Sevens Olympic Qualifying Tournament is scheduled to run from 18 to 19 November 2023. Further details, including the host tournament, will be eventually confirmed and announced by Asia Rugby.

Pool
Group A

Group B

Knockout stage

Ranking

2023 European Games 

The 2023 European Games in Kraków and Małopolska, Poland will serve as the European qualification tournament. Twelve teams will compete with the winner securing the Paris 2024 ticket.

Qualified teams

Pool
Group A

Group B

Group C

Knockout stage

Ranking

2023 RAN Women's Sevens 

2023 RAN Women's Sevens are scheduled to run from 19 to 20 August 2023 in Langford, British Columbia, Canada. Further information will be eventually confirmed and announced by Rugby Americas North.

Pool
Group A

Group B

Knockout stage

Ranking

2023 Oceania Women's Sevens Championship 

The 2023 Oceania Sevens Championship is scheduled for November 2023 with further details on the location to be eventually confirmed and announced by Oceania Rugby.

Pool
Group A

Group B

Knockout stage

Ranking

2023 South American Qualification Tournament 

Further details, including the host tournament and date, will be eventually confirmed and announced by Sudamérica Rugby.

Pool
Group A

Group B

Knockout stage

Ranking

2024 Final Olympic Qualifying Tournament 

The 2024 Final Olympic Qualifying Tournament is scheduled for June 2024 with further details on the location to be eventually confirmed and announced by World Rugby. Two runners-up from each of the six continental confederations are eligible to participate in the tournament with the winner earning the last remaining spot for Paris 2024.

Qualified teams

Pool
Group A

Group B

Group C

Knockout stage

Ranking

See also
 Rugby sevens at the 2024 Summer Olympics – Men's qualification

References 

Rugby sevens at the 2024 Summer Olympics – Women's tournament
Women
Women's events at the 2024 Summer Olympics